Edward David Fursdon (born 20 December 1952) is an English former cricketer. He is the current Lord Lieutenant of Devon.

Early life, military service and cricket
The son of Major General Francis William Edward Fursdon and his wife, Joan Rosemary Worssam, David Fursdon was born in December 1952 at Bitchet Green, Kent. He was educated at Sherborne School. After leaving Sherborne, Fursdon was commissioned into the 6th Gurkha Rifles as a second lieutenant in February 1972, where he served in Brunei and British Hong Kong. He had previously won a scholarship to the University of Oxford, where he studied at St John's College from October 1972-July 1975. 

While studying at Oxford, he made his debut in first-class cricket for Oxford University against Gloucestershire at Oxford in 1973. He played first-class cricket for Oxford until 1975, making sixteen appearances. Playing as an all-rounder, he scored 479 runs for Oxford at an average of 22.80 and a top score of 112 not out, which was his only first-class century and came against Cambridge University in The University Match of 1975. With his right-arm medium-fast bowling, he took 37 wickets at a bowling average of 35.94, with best figures of 4 for 13. He also made a single first-class appearance for a combined Oxford and Cambridge Universities cricket team against the touring Indians in 1974, taking his career best bowling figures of 6 for 60 during the first innings of the match. In addition to playing first-class cricket while at Oxford, he also made four List A one-day appearances for the Combined Universities cricket team which defeated two first class counties in the 1975 Benson & Hedges Cup. He gained two cricket blues while at Oxford.

Civil service, teaching and later life
After graduating from Oxford, Fursdon joined the Civil Service, working at the Ministry of Defence in the Navy Department and on nuclear disarmament and as part of a British delegation at a United Nations Conference on Disarmament in Geneva in 1979. Fursdon left the civil service in 1979 and transferred to Devon to take on the challenge of resuscitating the Fursdon Estate.  To help this he firstly became a teacher at Blundell's School, serving subsequently on the school's board of governors for 27 years, the last 11 as Chairman. He played minor counties cricket for Devon in 1981, making four appearances in the Minor Counties Championship. 

After attending the Royal Agricultural University (RAU) in 1984/6 (becoming an honorary Fellow in 2016), he qualified as a rural surveyor and worked as an equity partner; land agent and property auctioneer at Stags until 2003.  He was Board Chairman (2003-5) and then President (2005-7) of the Country Land and Business Association (CLA), was a Commissioner of the Affordable Rural Housing Commission in 2005/6 and was a member of the Board of both the Crown Estate (2008-16) and English Heritage (2010-14).

He volunteered as chairman of the SW Board for the London 2012 Olympic Games which oversaw the torch relay in the SW and the sailing competition at Weymouth and Portland; as chair of the DEFRA/Industry Future of Farming Review in 2013 looking at opportunities for New Entrants in Agriculture and as Chair of the SW Rural Productivity Commission for the four SW LEPs in 2015.  Other voluntary roles include Trustee on the Board of the National Trust (from 2016); Trustee of the Prince's Countryside Fund (from 2019), rural non-executive for the Duchy of Cornwall (from 2008) and initially working on the agricultural skills agenda and then as the first Chairman of TIAH (The Institute for Agriculture and Horticulture).

In 2014 he became Chairman of Dyson Farming and in 2017, a Commissioner and subsequently (2019) a Trustee of the Food, Farming and Countryside Commission.

He was awarded an honorary DSc at Harper Adams University in 2017; appointed High Sheriff of Devon for 2009/10 and the Lord Lieutenant of Devon from 2015. With his wife, Catriona, he has three sons and five grandchildren.

References

External links

1952 births
Living people
People from Seal, Kent
People educated at Sherborne School
Royal Gurkha Rifles officers
Alumni of St John's College, Oxford
English cricketers
Oxford University cricketers
Free Foresters cricketers
British Universities cricketers
Oxford and Cambridge Universities cricketers
English civil servants
Schoolteachers from Devon
Devon cricketers
Alumni of the Royal Agricultural University
English surveyors
Lord-Lieutenants of Devon